Caupolicana elegans is a species of bee in the family Colletidae. It is found in Mexico and the United States (Arizona).

References

External links 

 Caupolicana elegans at Discover Life

Colletidae
Insects described in 1965
Insects of Mexico
Insects of the United States
Natural history of Arizona
Taxa named by Philip Hunter Timberlake